Robert Rodallega (born 18 November 1969) is a Venezuelan footballer. He played in six matches for the Venezuela national football team from 1991 to 1997. He was also part of Venezuela's squad for the 1991 Copa América tournament.

References

External links
 
 

1969 births
Living people
Venezuelan footballers
Venezuela international footballers
Association football midfielders
Place of birth missing (living people)